The 1949–50 Washington State Cougars men's basketball team represented Washington State College for the 1949–50 NCAA college basketball season. Led by 22nd-year head coach Jack Friel, the Cougars were members of the Pacific Coast Conference and played their home games on campus at Bohler Gymnasium in Pullman, Washington.

 They met Southern division winner UCLA in a best-of-three series in Los Angeles for the PCC title, which the seventh-ranked Bruins swept in 

Washington State's next winning record in conference play came seventeen years later, in the 1966–67 season.

Postseason results

|-
!colspan=6 style=| Pacific Coast Conference Playoff Series

References

External links
Sports Reference – Washington State Cougars: 1949–50 basketball season

Washington State Cougars men's basketball seasons
Washington State Cougars
Washington State
Washington State